Ópata (also Tegüima, Teguima, Tehuima, Tehui, Eudeve, Eudeva, Heve, Dohema, Jova, Joval, Tonichi, Sonori and Ure) is either of two closely related Uto-Aztecan languages, Teguima and Eudeve, spoken by the Opata people of northern central Sonora in Mexico and Southeast of Arizona in the United States. It was believed to be dead already in 1930, and Carl Sofus Lumholtz reported the Opata to have become "Mexicanized" and lost their language and customs already when traveling through Sonora in the 1890s.

In a 1993 survey by the Instituto Nacional Indigenista, 15 people in the Mexican Federal District self-identified as speakers of Ópata. This may not mean, however, that the language was actually living, since linguistic nomenclature in Mexico is notoriously fuzzy. Sometimes Eudeve is called Opata, a term which should be restricted to Teguima. Eudeve (which is split into the Heve (Egue) and Dohema dialects) and Teguima (also called Ópata, Ore) are distinct languages, but sometimes have been considered merely dialects of one single language. The INALI (Mexican National Institute for Indigenous Languages) does not count Opata among the currently extant indigenous languages of Mexico.

Although the Opata Nation, an unrecognized tribe, considers the language inactive, they are in the process of its language revitalization. The Fundación OPATA-TEGUIMA launched the first-ever Opata Living Dictionary in 2021 in collaboration with Living Tongues Institute for Endangered Languages.

Classification
Opata had long been considered to be part of the Taracahitic languages, but this is no longer considered a valid genetic unit.

Morphology
Opata is an agglutinative language, where words use suffix complexes for a variety of purposes with several morphemes strung together.

References

Lombardo, Natal. 1702. "Arte de la Lengua Teguima vulgarmente llamada Opata". México: Miguel de Ribera.
Lombardo, Natal. n.d., ca. 1702. Arte de la Lengua Teguima vulgarmente llamada Opata. Ayer ms. 1641. Newberry Library, Chicago.
Loaysa, Balthasar, unknown year, Arte de la lengua hegue. Ms. in Bibliothèque Nationale, París; copia de W.E. Gates en la Ayer Collection, Newberry Library, Chicago.
Lionnet, Andrés. 1979. El lexico del eudeve. Mimeography. Friends of Uto-Aztecan Working Conference, Instituto de Investigaciones Antropologicas, Universidad Nacional Autonoma de Mexico, Mexico, June 23. : .
 Miller, Wick R., 1983, "A Note on Extinct Languages of Northwest Mexico of Supposed Uto-Aztecan Affiliation", International Journal of American Linguistics, Vol. 49, No. 3, Papers Presented at a Symposium on Uto-Aztecan Historical Linguistics (Jul., 1983), pp. 328–334
Shaul, David Leedom, 1989 "Teguima (Opata) phonology", Southwestern Journal of Linguistics 9:150-162. ...
Shaul, David Leedom, 1990, "Teguima (Opata) Inflectional Morphology", International Journal of American Linguistics, Vol. 56, No. 4 (Oct., 1990), pp. 561–573
Smith, Buckingham

Agglutinative languages
Southern Uto-Aztecan languages
Indigenous languages of Mexico
Extinct languages of North America
Endangered Uto-Aztecan languages
Languages extinct in the 2010s
2010 disestablishments in Mexico